Mike Burrows (17 April 1943 – 15 August 2022) was a British bicycle designer from Norwich, England.

Burrow is best known by the general public for his collaborative work with the design of the track carbon-fibre Lotus 108 time trial bicycle manufactured by Lotus for Chris Boardman, when he won the 1992 Olympic 4000m pursuit in Barcelona. He also attempted to copy the famous "Old Faithful" bike used by Graeme Obree, to be used as a spare in an attempt on the world hour record. However Obree did not like the bike and did not use in any record attempt.

Burrows had long been involved in the recumbent bicycle/tricycle world, having designed the Speedy or Windcheetah trike and more recently the  Ratcatcher, Ratracer and Ratracer B. He has collaborated on projects with Richard Ballantine.

Burrows was also involved in utility cycling and has designed a folding cycle (the Giant Halfway), an especially thin machine (the 2D) that takes up little space in a hallway, the 8-Freight cargo bike in use with cycle courier companies such as Outspoken Delivery, and makes customised screen and PA carrying freight bikes with extendable "batwings" for AV2 Hire.

In the 1990s, Burrows worked for Giant Bicycles and designed the compact frame TCR road bike among others, the bike design was truly revolutionary, to minimise bike manufacturing cost.

Burrows' designs often feature cantilever suspended wheels. He supplied a bike fitted with a front monoblade to television science presenter Adam Hart-Davis, which featured in some of Hart-Davis' programmes.  Hart-Davis also owned a Speedy, finished in pink and yellow.

Burrows was involved with the design of a recumbent that could break the speed record for a human-powered vehicle (HPV). The design Aim 93 attempted to break the record at the International HPV Association's world championships at Battle Mountain.

Burrows died from cancer on 15 August 2022, at the age of 79.

Bibliography 
 Bicycle Design: Towards the Perfect Machine.
 From Bicycle to Superbike.

References

External links 
 Velovision 8-Freight review
 Velovision Ratcatcher review
 Official 8 Freight website
 8 Freight users
 8Freight at LeftFieldBikes
 Next stop Nevada: British cycle team aim at 90 mph record

1943 births
2022 deaths
British cycle designers
English male cyclists
Sportspeople from Norwich